Robert Burn may refer to:

 Robert Burn (classicist) (1829–1904), English classical scholar and archaeologist
 Robert Burn (naturalist), Australian naturalist and citizen scientist
 Robert Scott Burn (1825–1901), Scottish engineer and author
 Robert Burn (architect) (1752–1815) Scottish architect

See also
 Robert Burns (1759–1796), Scottish poet
 Robert Burns (disambiguation)